The Ethiopia Museum of Art and Science Science is a  lying science museum in Addis Ababa, Ethiopia. It was inaugurated by Prime Minister Abiy Ahmed along with other high-ranking officials on 4 October 2022. Part of Chinese aided Addis Ababa Riverside Development Project Phase II, the museum contains exhibition hall dedicated to scientific and developmental research. In addition, the second room is dedicated to a three-dimensional theatre movie called Dome Theatre. 
The museum also contains several building complexes and interactive display screens, cybersecurity, finance, geographical information system (GIS), service industries, data analysis, manufacturing, and robotics.

During the inauguration, Abiy Ahmed highlighted the importance of the science museum for state-sponsored digital transformation in the country and promised that it would give opportunities for young people workshops.

Description 
The science museum was inaugurated by Prime Minister Abiy Ahmed and other high ranking government officials on 4 October 2022 in the hub of Addis Ababa. Part of Chinese aided Addis Ababa Riverside Green Development Project Phase II, the museum contains a science and technology exhibition hall dedicated for scientific and developmental research.

The inauguration was coincided with Pan-African Conference on Artificial Intelligence 2022, acclaimed as progress towards envisioning the future of technology in Africa's digital transformation.

In the museum, there are several building complexes and interactive display screens in local solutions in healthcare, finance, cybersecurity, geographic information system (GIS), service industries, data analysis, manufacturing, and robotics. Abiy Ahmed highlighted the importance of the advance of science and technology, citing Ethiopia's Digital Economy Strategy, which operated two years prior. Abiy emphasized the necessity of Artificial Intelligence Institute as part of government institutions undertaking digital transformation in the country. Furthermore, Abiy promised that the museum would provide workshop opportunities for young people. The construction totally costed 1.1 billion birr.

References

2022 establishments in Ethiopia
Buildings and structures in Addis Ababa
Museums in Ethiopia
Science and technology in Ethiopia
21st-century architecture in Ethiopia